Ayodhya Burns is the debut EP by the Indian black metal band Heathen Beast.

Track listing

References

Black metal EPs
2010 debut EPs
Heathen Beast albums